Tavastian dialects are Western Finnish dialects spoken in parts of Western and Southern Finland. The dialect spoken in the city of Tampere is part of the Tavastian dialects. The Tavastian dialects have influenced other Finnish dialects (especially the Southwest Finnish dialects).

Dialectal features

Pronunciation of D 
Where Standard Finnish has /d/, the Tavastian dialects have either /r/ or /l/ in its place. The r-pronunciation is the more common one. The l-pronunciation is encountered on two separate areas: in the eastern boundary of the dialect area as well as in a smaller area which includes Akaa and Tammela to name a few.

Therefore, lehdet (leaves) can be pronounced as lehret or lehlet. However, the plural of vesi (water, standard plural vedet) can be pronounced as veset in the r-dialects, in order to not cause confusion with veret (bloods, plural of veri).

Pronunciation of ts 
Instead of the standard consonant cluster ts, tt (long /t/) is used, e.g. metsä (forest) is mettä. It is not affected by consonant gradation, so the genitive form is mettän.

At least historically, the dialects of Tuusula, Pornainen and nearby areas used a ss instead, e.g. messä, genitive: messän. This has mainly been supplanted by the more common tt-pronunciation.

Diphthongs uo, yö and  
The Standard Finnish diphthongs /uo/, /yö/ and  correspond respectively to /ua/, /yä/ and /iä/. For example, nuori (young) is pronounced nuari.

Long a and ä 
As is the case for other western Finnish dialects, the Tavastian dialects mostly use the standard-like aa and ää. The dialects near Ikaalinen are an exception, as aa and ää have developed into oo (long [ɔ]) and ee (long [ɛ]) respectively, e.g. moo instead of maa and pee instead of pää. Nowadays this feature is rarer.  

A diphthongization of ää into iä or ie has been attested from the dialects near Hollola, e.g. pää may be piä or pie and leipää ("bread", partitive) may be leipiä or leipie. This feature is rare nowadays.

-ea and -eä
-ea and -eä are most notably used as a suffix for adjectives. In the Tavastian dialects, the most common variant of this is -ee, e.g. korkee instead of korkea (high). The variant used for shorter words, such as pimeä (dark), may be either pimee or pimmee, depending on whether the dialect has gemination or not. 

The standard -ea-type is found in northern Päijät-Häme, such as in Nastola, Hollola and Heinola.

A rare -ie-type (korkie, pimie) has been attested from Lammi, Hämeenkoski and Padasjoki.

/h/ after unstressed syllables 
The h-sound after unstressed syllables has been preserved in the dialects of Kymenlaakso. For example, lampaat (sheep, plural) may be lampahat as in many Southern Ostrobothnian dialects and tupaan (illative of tupa) may be tupah similarly to its equivalent in the Karelian language. Other Tavastian dialects have not preserved this sound.

Illative case

Third infinitive 
A suffix -Vn (where V corresponds to the preceding vowel) is used instead of the standard -maan/-mään, e.g. ottaan, tekeen instead of ottamaan, tekemään.

Other features 
In the Tavastian dialects, /ŋk/, doesn't change with consonant gradiation: henki - henken (standard Finnish: henki - hengen).

In the southeastern Tavastian dialects, words often have a final -i, that is not found in standard Finnish, Tavastian min nimei 'my name' (standard Finnish: minun nimi).

See also 
 Tavastians

References 

Finnish dialects